During the 1904–05 Scottish football season, Celtic competed in the Scottish First Division.

Results

Scottish First Division

First Division play-off

Scottish Cup

References

Scottish football championship-winning seasons
Celtic F.C. seasons
Celtic